James or Jim Beattie may refer to:
James Beattie (poet) (1735–1803), Scottish poet, moralist and philosopher
James Hay Beattie (1768–1790), Scottish scholar, son of above
James Herries Beattie (1881–1972), New Zealand journalist, historian, and ethnologist
James J. Beattie (1942–2019), American heavyweight boxer, see Gene Schoor
Jim Beattie (politician) (born 1948), Canadian politician
Jim Beattie (baseball) (born 1954), American baseball player
Jim Beattie (musician), Scottish musician, formerly of Primal Scream
Jim Beattie (footballer) (born 1973), Scottish footballer
James Beattie (footballer) (born 1978), English footballer
James K. Beattie, Australian chemist

See also
Beatties (James Beattie Ltd), a group of department stores within the House of Fraser Group
James Beatty (disambiguation)
James Beaty (disambiguation)